Westfield is a community in the Canadian province of Nova Scotia, located in the Region of Queens Municipality.

References
 Westfield on Destination Nova Scotia

Communities in the Region of Queens Municipality
General Service Areas in Nova Scotia